A hobo is a migrant worker in the United States. Hoboes, tramps, and bums are generally regarded as related, but distinct: a hobo travels and is willing to work; a tramp travels, but avoids work if possible; a bum neither travels nor works.

Etymology

The origin of the term is unknown. According to etymologist Anatoly Liberman, the only certain detail about its origin is the word was first noticed in American English circa 1890. The term has also been dated to 1889 in the Western—probably Northwestern—United States, and to 1888. Liberman points out that many folk etymologies fail to answer the question: "Why did the word become widely known in California (just there) by the early Nineties (just then)?" Author Todd DePastino notes that some have said that it derives from the term "hoe-boy", coming from the hoe they are using and meaning "farmhand", or a greeting such as "Ho, boy", but that he does not find these to be convincing explanations. Bill Bryson suggests in Made in America (1998) that it could either come from the railroad greeting, "Ho, beau!" or a syllabic abbreviation of "homeward bound". It could also come from the words "homeless boy" or "homeless Bohemian". H. L. Mencken, in his The American Language (4th ed., 1937), wrote:

Tramps and hobos are commonly lumped together, but in their own sight they are sharply differentiated. A hobo or bo is simply a migratory laborer; he may take some longish holidays, but soon or late he returns to work. A tramp never works if it can be avoided; he simply travels. Lower than either is the bum, who neither works nor travels, save when impelled to motion by the police.

History

While drifters have always existed in human society, the term became common only after the broad adoption of railroads, a means of free travel for those willing, often out of financial constraints, to hop aboard train cars furtively in violation of the law. With the end of the American Civil War in the 1860s, many discharged veterans returning home began hopping freight trains. Others looking for work on the American frontier followed the railways west aboard freight trains in the late 19th century.

In 1906, Professor Layal Shafee, after an exhaustive study, put the number of tramps in the United States at about 500,000 (about 0.6% of the US population at the time). His article "What Tramps Cost Nation" was published by The New York Telegraph in 1911, when he estimated the number had surged to 700,000.

The number of hoboes increased greatly during the Great Depression era of the 1930s. With no work and no prospects at home, many decided to travel for free by freight train and try their luck elsewhere.

Life as a hobo was dangerous. In addition to the problems of being itinerant, poor, and far from home and support, plus the hostility of many train crews, they faced the railroad police, nicknamed "bulls", who had a reputation of violence against trespassers. Moreover, riding on a freight train is dangerous in itself. British poet W. H. Davies, author of The Autobiography of a Super-Tramp, lost a foot when he fell under the wheels when trying to jump aboard a train. It was easy to be trapped between cars, and one could freeze to death in cold weather. When freezer cars were loaded at an ice factory, any hobo inside was likely to be killed.

Around the end of World War II, railroads began to move from steam to diesel locomotives, making jumping freight trains more difficult. This, in combination with increased postwar prosperity, led to a decline in the number of hoboes. In the 1970s and 1980s hobo numbers were augmented by returning Vietnam War veterans, many of whom were disillusioned with settled  society. Overall, the national economic demand for a mobile surplus labor force has declined over time, leading to fewer hoboes.

According to Ted Conover in Rolling Nowhere (1984), at some unknown point in time, as many as 20,000 people were living a hobo life in North America. Modern freight trains are much faster and thus harder to ride than in the 1930s, but they can still be boarded in railyards.

Culture

Expressions used through the 1940s

Hoboes were noted for, among other things, the distinctive lingo that arose among them. Some examples follow:

Many hobo terms have become part of common language, such as "big house", "glad rags", "main drag", and others.

Hobo signs and graffiti

Almost from the beginning of the existence of hoboes, as early as the 1870s, it was reported that they communicated with each other by way of a system of cryptic "hobo signs", which would be chalked in prominent or relevant places to clandestinely alert future hoboes about important local information. Many listings of these symbols have been made. A few symbols include:
 A triangle with hands, signifying that the homeowner has a gun.
 A horizontal zigzag signifying a barking dog.
 A circle with two parallel arrows meaning "Get out fast," as hoboes are not welcome in the area.
 A cat signifying that a kind lady lives here.

Reports of hoboes using these symbols appeared in newspapers and popular books straight through the Depression, and continue to turn up in American popular culture; for example, John Hodgman's book The Areas of My Expertise features a section on hobo signs listing signs found in newspapers of the day as well as several whimsical ones invented by Hodgman, and the Free Art and Technology Lab released a QR Hobo Code, with a QR stenciler, in July 2011. Displays on hobo signs have been exhibited in the Steamtown National Historic Site at Scranton, Pennsylvania, operated by the National Park Service, and in the National Cryptologic Museum in Annapolis Junction, Maryland, and Webster's Third New International Dictionary supplies a listing of hobo signs under the entry for "hobo".

Despite an apparently strong record of authentication, however, there is doubt as to whether hobo signs were ever actually in practical use by hoboes. They may simply have been invented early on by a writer or writers seeking to add to the folklore surrounding hoboes soon after they acquired the name, an invention perpetuated and embellished by others over the years, aided occasionally by amenable hoboes themselves. Several hoboes during the days that the signs were reportedly most in use asserted that they were in fact a "popular fancy" or "a fabrication". Nels Anderson, who both hoboed himself and studied hoboes extensively for a University of Chicago master's thesis, wrote in 1932,Another merit of the book [Godfrey Irwin's 1931 American Tramp and Underworld Slang] is that the author has not subscribed to the fiction that American tramps have a sign language, as so many professors are wont to believe. Though newspapers in the early and peak days of hoboing (1870s through the Depression) printed photos and drawings of hoboes leaving these signs, these may have been staged in order to add color to the story.

Nonetheless, it is certain that hoboes have used some graffiti to communicate, in the form of "monikers" (sometimes "monicas"). These generally consisted simply of a road name (moniker), a date, and the direction the hobo was heading then. This would be written in a prominent location where other hoboes would see it. Jack London, in recounting his hobo days, wrote,Water-tanks are tramp directories. Not all in idle wantonness do tramps carve their monicas, dates, and courses. Often and often have I met hoboes earnestly inquiring if I had seen anywhere such and such a "stiff" or his monica. And more than once I have been able to give the monica of recent date, the water-tank, and the direction in which he was then bound. And promptly the hobo to whom I gave the information lit out after his pal. I have met hoboes who, in trying to catch a pal, had pursued clear across the continent and back again, and were still going.The use of monikers persists to this day, although since the rise of cell phones a moniker is more often used simply to "tag" a train car or location. Some moniker writers have tagged train cars extensively; one who tagged under the name Bozo Texino during the 1970s and ’80s estimated that in one year ("where I went overboard") he marked over 30,000 train cars. However, not all moniker writers (or "boxcar artists") are hoboes; Bozo Texino in fact worked for the railroad, though others such as "A No. 1" and "Palm Tree Herby" rode trains as tramps or hoboes.

Ethical code

Hobo culture—though it has always had many points of contact with the mainstream American culture of its day—has also always been somewhat separate and distinct, with different cultural norms. Hobo culture's ethics have always been subject to disapproval from the mainstream culture; for example, hopping freight trains, an integral part of hobo life, has always been illegal in the U.S. Nonetheless, the ethics of hobo culture can be regarded as fairly coherent and internally consistent, at least to the extent that any culture's various individual people maintain the same ethical standards. That is to say, any attempt at an exhaustive enumeration of hobo ethics is bound to be foiled at least to some extent by the diversity of hoboes and their ideas of the world. This difficulty has not kept hoboes themselves from attempting the exercise. An ethical code was created by Tourist Union #63 (a hobo union created in the mid-1800s to dodge anti-vagrancy laws, which did not apply to union members) during its 1889 National Hobo Convention:

 Decide your own life; don't let another person run or rule you.
 When in town, always respect the local law and officials, and try to be a gentleman at all times.
 Don't take advantage of someone who is in a vulnerable situation, locals or other hoboes.
 Always try to find work, even if temporary, and always seek out jobs nobody wants. By doing so you not only help a business along, but ensure employment should you return to that town again.
 When no employment is available, make your own work by using your added talents at crafts.
 Do not allow yourself to become a stupid drunk and set a bad example for locals' treatment of other hoboes.
 When jungling in town, respect handouts and do not wear them out; another hobo will be coming along who will need them as badly, if not worse than you.
 Always respect nature; do not leave garbage where you are jungling.
 If in a community jungle, always pitch in and help.
 Try to stay clean, and boil up wherever possible.
 When traveling, ride your train respectfully. Take no personal chances. Cause no problems with operating crew or host railroad. Act like an extra crew member.
 Do not cause problems in a train yard; another hobo will be coming along who will need passage through that yard.
 Do not allow other hoboes to molest children; expose all molesters to authorities – they are the worst garbage to infest any society.
 Help all runaway children, and try to induce them to return home.
 Help your fellow hoboes whenever and wherever needed; you may need their help someday.
 If present at a hobo court and you have testimony, give it. Whether for or against the accused, your voice counts!

Conventions

General

There are numerous hobo conventions throughout the United States each year. The ephemeral ways of hobo conventions are mostly dependent on the resources of their hosts. Some conventions are part of railroad conventions or "railroad days"; others quasi-private affairs hosted by long-time hoboes; still others surreptitious affairs on private land, as in abandoned quarries along major rivers.

Most non-mainstream conventions are held at current or historical railroad stops. The most notable is the National Hobo Convention held in Britt, Iowa. The town first hosted the Convention in 1900, but there followed a hiatus of thirty-three years. Since 1934 the convention has been held annually in Britt, on the second weekend in August.

Notable persons

Notable hoboes
 Jack Black, author of You Can't Win (1926) 
 Maurice W. Graham, a.k.a. "Steam Train Maury"
 Joe Hill
 Leon Ray Livingston, a.k.a. "A No.1"
 Harry McClintock
 Utah Phillips
 Robert Joseph Silveria Jr., a.k.a. "Sidetrack", who killed 34 other hoboes before turning himself in to the authorities
 T-Bone Slim
 Bertha Thompson, a.k.a. "Boxcar Bertha", was widely believed to be a real person. Sister of the Road was penned by Ben Reitman and presented as an autobiography.
 Jim Tully, an author who penned several pulp fiction books, 1928 through 1945.
 Steven Gene Wold, a.k.a. "Seasick Steve"

Notables who have hoboed

 Nels Anderson, American sociologist
 Raúl Héctor Castro, Mexican American politician, diplomat and judge
 Ralph Chaplin, author of labor anthem "Solidarity Forever"
 Yvon Chouinard
 Stompin' Tom Connors, Canadian Singer, Songwriter
 Ted Conover, sociologist who rode the rails researching his book Rolling Nowhere
 W. H. Davies, Welsh poet who also lived as a tramp
 Jack Dempsey
 U Dhammaloka
 Loren Eiseley
 Woody Guthrie, American folk musician
 James Eads How, wealthy community organizer
 , German adventurer and novelist
 Harry Kemp, American poet and prose writer
 Jack Kerouac, American author
 Louis L'Amour
 Jack London, American author
 Chris McCandless, American adventurer who sometimes referred to himself as "Alexander Supertramp"
 Robert Mitchum
 Frederick Niven, Canadian author
 Bob Nolan, Singer and Songwriter.
 George Orwell, British author
 John Patric
 Harry Partch
 Al Purdy
 Ben Reitman, anarchist and physician
 Carl Sandburg
 Emil Sitka
 Philip Taft, labor historian
 Mike Brodie, photographer.
 Dave Van Ronk
 Dale Wasserman

In mainstream culture

Books
 All the Strange Hours: The Excavation of a Life, by Loren Eiseley, 1975. 
 A Period of Juvenile Prosperity (2013) by Mike Brodie, 
 The Areas of My Expertise by John Hodgman - Humor book which features a lengthy section on hoboes, including a list of 700 hobo names which spawned an online effort to illustrate the complete list.
 The  Autobiography of a Super-Tramp, by W. H. Davies, 1908
 Bottom Dogs, by Edward Dahlberg
 Beggars of Life, (1924), by Jim Tully
 Evasion by Anonymous
 From Coast to Coast with Jack London by "A-No.-1" (Leon Ray Livingston)
 The Freighthopper's Manual for North America: Hoboing in the 21st Century, by Daniel Leen. .
 Hard Travellin': The Hobo and His History, by Kenneth Allsop. .
 Hobo, by Eddy Joe Cotton, 2002. 
 The Hobo - The Sociology of the Homeless Man, by Nels Anderson, 1923.
 The Hobo Handbook - A Field Guide to Living by Your Own Rules, by Josh Mack, 2011.  (Book on the Hobo lifestyle, written by one who has ridden the rails in recent years.)
 Ironweed by William Kennedy, 1983. A Pulitzer Prize-winning novel, also adapted for a 1987 film (see below).
 The Jungle by Upton Sinclair contains a section in which the main character, Jurgis Rudkus, abandons his family in Chicago and becomes a hobo for a while.
 Knights of the Road, by Roger A. Bruns, 1980. .
 Lonesome Road, by Thomas Minehan, 1941.
 Lonesome Traveler, by Jack Kerouac ("The Vanishing American Hobo")
 The Miraculous Journey of Edward Tulane by Kate DiCamillo
 Muzzlers, Guzzlers, and Good Yeggs by Joe Coleman
 Of Mice and Men, by John Steinbeck
 On the Road, by Jack Kerouac
 Once a Hobo... (1999), by Monte Holm
 One More Train to Ride: The Underground World of Modern American Hobos by Clifford Williams.
 Riding the Rails: Teenagers on the Move During the Great Depression by Errol Lincoln Uys, (Routledge, 2003)
 Riding Toward Everywhere by William T. Vollmann, 2008. 
 The Road, by Jack London
 Rolling Nowhere: Riding the Rails with America's Hoboes by Ted Conover - Paperback: 304 pages, Publisher: Vintage (2001), 
 Sister of The Road: The Autobiography of Boxcar Bertha - (as told to) Dr. Ben Reitman
 Stumptown Kid, By Carol Gorman and Ron J. Finley
 Tales of an American Hobo (1989), by Charles Elmer Fox
 Tramping on Life (1922) and More Miles (1926), by Harry Kemp
 Tramping with Tramps (1899) by Josiah Flynt
 Waiting for Nothing, Tom Kromer
 Wild Honey (1927), by Frederick Niven
 You Can't Win, by Jack Black
 Yankee Hobo in the Orient, (1943), by John Patric
 Down and Out in Paris and London, by George Orwell

Comics
 Kings in Disguise (1988), by James Vance and Dan Burr
 Laugh-Out-Loud Cats, webcomic by Adam Koford, featuring two anthropomorphic cats as hoboes.
 The Avenger and master archer in Marvel Comics, Hawkeye, is aware of, and can read hobo code in Matt Fraction and David Aja's 2012 run on the character.
 USA Comics #2 (1941) introduced Vagabond, a police officer named Pat Murphy who created an alter ego, Chauncey Throttlebottom III, a well-spoken hobo, to fight crime.
 USA Comics #5 (1941) had a character, Butch Brogan, alias Fighting Hobo, that helps save a kidnapped puppy in "The Dog-Nappers".
 The TaleSpin comic The Long Flight Home reveals Kit Cloudkicker was once a hobo prior to working for Don Karnage.

Documentaries
 Hobo (1992), a documentary by John T. Davis, following the life of a hobo on his travels through the United States.
 American Experience, "Riding the Rails" (1999), a PBS documentary by Lexy Lovell and Michael Uys, narrated by Richard Thomas, detailing the hoboes of the Great Depression, with interviews of those who rode the rails during those years.
 The American Hobo (2003), a documentary narrated by Ernest Borgnine featuring interviews with Merle Haggard and James Michener.
 The Human Experience, (2008), a documentary by Charles Kinnane. The first experience follows Jeffrey and his brother Clifford to the streets of New York City where the boys live with the homeless for a week in one of the coldest winters on record. The boys look for hope and camaraderie among their homeless companions, learning how to survive on the streets.

Fictional characters

Examples of characters based on hoboes include:
 Charlie Chaplin's "Little Tramp"
 Emmett Kelly's "Weary Willy"
 Red Skelton's "Freddy the Freeloader"
 "Bagdad, Hobo Detective," featured in the pulp magazine Popular Detective (1937 & 1938)

Films

 The Circus (1928), directed by Charlie Chaplin.
 Beggars of Life (1928), directed by William A. Wellman
 City Lights (1931), directed by Charlie Chaplin.
 Number Seventeen (1932), directed by Alfred Hitchcock.
 Wild Boys of the Road (1933), directed by William A. Wellman.
 City Limits (1934), directed by William Nigh.
 Modern Times (1936), directed by Charlie Chaplin.
 Father Steps Out (1941), directed by Jean Yarbrough.
 Sullivan's Travels (1941), directed by Preston Sturges.
 Jack London (1943), biopic directed by Alfred Santell.
 It Happened on Fifth Avenue (1947), directed by Roy Del Ruth.
 Joe Hill (1971), directed by Bo Widerberg
 Boxcar Bertha (1972), directed by Martin Scorsese and starring Barbara Hershey as a sexy hobo girl during the Great Depression.
 Emperor of the North Pole a.k.a. Emperor of the North (1973), directed by Robert Aldrich. Loosely based on Jack London's The Road.
 Hard Times a.k.a. The Streetfighter (1975), directed by Walter Hill (his directorial debut), and starring Charles Bronson (as a hobo turned street fighter).
 The Billion Dollar Hobo (1977), starring Tim Conway and Will Geer.
  Pee-Wee's Big Adventure (1985), starring Pee-wee Herman, directed by Tim Burton. Pee-wee meets Hobo Jack when he hops a freight train on his way to the Alamo.
 Vagabond (1985) (French title: Sans Toit Ni Loi), directed by Agnès Varda, tells the story of a traveling woman's untimely death through flashbacks and interviews with the people who met her.
 The Journey of Natty Gann (1985), starring Meredith Salenger as a young girl riding the rails to find her father.
 Ironweed (1987), directed by Héctor Babenco and based on the Pulitzer Prize-winning novel by William Kennedy, who also wrote the screenplay.
 Life Stinks (1991), directed by and starring Mel Brooks.
 Tokyo Godfathers (2003), an anime directed by Satoshi Kon.
 Into the Wild (2007), directed by Sean Penn, based on Jon Krakauer's non-fiction book about Christopher McCandless.
 Resurrecting the Champ (2007), starring Samuel L. Jackson and Josh Hartnett, directed by Rod Lurie.
 Kit Kittredge: An American Girl (2008).
 Hobo with a Shotgun (2011), an exploitation film directed by Jason Eisener and written by John Davies, starring Rutger Hauer as a vigilante hobo.
 The Muppets (2011), the film features a character named Hobo Joe (played by Zach Galifianakis) and some Whatnot hoboes. They later appeared in the sequel Muppets Most Wanted (2014).
 Man of Steel (2013) depicts Clark Kent living as a homeless itinerant worker before ultimately taking the mantle of Superman and finding work as a reporter at the Daily Planet.
 Nomadland (2020), directed by Chloé Zhao.
 Many animated cartoons depict hoboes as main or secondary characters, hobo-related activities such as traveling by train, with a bindle, or in the company of hoboes. For example, Warner Brothers' Box Car Blues (1930) with Bosko, Hobo Gadget Band (1939), MGM's Henpecked Hoboes (1946) with George and Junior in their first appearance, Mouse Wreckers (1948), 8 Ball Bunny (1950) with Bugs Bunny, and The Easter Bunny Is Comin' to Town (1977).

Music

Artists

Musicians known for hobo songs include: Tim Barry, Baby Gramps, Railroad Earth, Harry McClintock, Ramblin' Jack Elliott, Utah Phillips, Jimmie Rodgers, Seasick Steve, and Boxcar Willie.

Songs

Examples of hobo songs include:
 "Be a Hobo" by Moondog
 "Big Rock Candy Mountain" by Harry McClintock, recorded by various artists including Burl Ives, Tom Waits, Lisa Loeb, Baby Gramps, The Restarts and Harry Dean Stanton
 "Driver Pull" by Tim Barry
 "Hallelujah, I'm a Bum," recorded by Harry McClintock, Al Jolson, and others
 "Hard Travelin'" and "Hobo's Lullaby" by Woody Guthrie
 "Here Comes Your Man" by the Pixies, about hoboes travelling on trains in California and dying because of earthquakes
 "Here I Go Again" by Whitesnake, featuring the lyric, "Like a hobo I was born to walk alone," later changed to "like a drifter"
 "Hobo" by The Hackensaw Boys
 "Hobo Bill", "I Ain't Got No Home," and "Mysteries of a Hobo's Life," performed by Cisco Houston
 "Hobo Bill's Last Ride" by Jimmy Rogers, also recorded by Manfred Mann's Earth Band
 "Hobo Blues" and "The Hobo" by John Lee Hooker
 "Hobo Chang Ba" by Captain Beefheart
 "Hobo Flats" by Oliver Nelson
 "Hobo Flats" by Count Basie
 "Hobo Jungle" by The Band
 "Hobo Humpin' Slobo Babe" by Whale (band)
 "Hobo Kinda Man" by Lynyrd Skynyrd
 "Hobo, You Can't Ride This Train" by Louis Armstrong
 "The Hobo" by Merle Haggard
 "The Hobo Song" by John Prine, also covered by Johnny Cash
 "The Hobo Song" by Jack Bonus, also recorded by Jerry Garcia's bluegrass group, Old & In the Way
 "The Hobo Song" by Kevin Roth, from the Shining Time Station's Christmas special, 'Tis a Gift
 "Hobo's Lullaby" (a.k.a. "Weary Hobo") by Goebel Reeves, recorded by various artists, including Woody Guthrie, Arlo Guthrie, Emmylou Harris, Pete Seeger, The Kingston Trio, and Ramblin' Jack Eliot
 "Hobo's Meditation" by Jimmie Rodgers, recorded by Linda Ronstadt on the album Trio
 "Hobos on Parade" by Shannon Wright
 "Homeless Brother" by Don McLean
 "Hopscotch Willie" by Stephen Malkmus
 "I Am a Lonesome Hobo", "Only a Hobo," and "Ramblin' Gamblin' Willie" by Bob Dylan
 "I Take a Lot of Pride in What I Am" by Merle Haggard
 "Jack Straw" by Robert Hunter and Bob Weir
 "Jesus' Blood Never Failed Me Yet" a recording by composer Gavin Bryars of a hobo singing on a London street
 "King of the Road" by Roger Miller
 "Kulkurin Valssi" (Hobo Waltz) by Arthur Kylander
 "Lännen lokari" (Western Logger) by Hiski Salomaa
 "Last of the Hobo Kings" by Mary Gauthier
 "Like a Hobo" by Charlie Winston
 "Mary Lane" by Fred Eaglesmith
 "Morning Glory" by Tim Buckley, lyrics by Larry Beckett
 "My Traveling Star" by James Taylor
 "Never Tire of the Road" by Andy Irvine
 "Orange Claw Hammer" by Captain Beefheart, which contains the lyric, "I'm on the bum where the hobos run, the air breaks with filthy chatter."
 "Papa Hobo" and "Hobo's Blues" by Paul Simon
 "Ramblin' Man" by Hank Williams Sr.
 "Sergeant Small" by Andy Irvine
 "Streets of London" by Ralph McTell
 "Waiting for a Train" by Jimmie Rodgers
 "Way Out There" by Bob Nolan, recorded by the Sons of the Pioneers
 "Western Hobo" by The Carter Family

Stage
 King of the Hobos (2014), a one-man musical that premiered at Emerging Artists Theatre in New York City, is centered around the death of James Eads How, known during his lifetime as the "Millionaire Hobo".

Television
 Criminal Minds (season 4), episode 5 "Catching Out" (2008)
 Mad Men (season 1), episode 8, "The Hobo Code" (2007)
 Mannix (season 6), episode 22 "To Quote a Dead Man" (1973)
 The Magic School Bus special, A Magic School Bus Halloween, features Lily Tomlin's character "Archibald Dauntless"
 "E-I-E-I-(Annoyed Grunt)" Episode 5 of Season 11 of The Simpsons (1999). Sneed teases Homer about his shoes, claiming they are Gucci loafers, but Homer says he bought them from a hobo.
 The Littlest Hobo: long-running Lassie-esque franchise about a roving dog that lives the hobo lifestyle
 In The Simpsons episode "The Old Man and the Key", Grampa explains hobo symbols to Bart. In another episode, the Simpsons meet a hobo who tells them American folktales in exchange for a spongebath.
 Shameless (Season 9), Episode 10 and 11. Frank Gallagher becomes part of a hobo competition, a competition looking for the best hobo in Chicago.
 Reacher (Season 1), Episode 2. Reacher confirms he is not a Vagrant, he's a Hobo.

See also
 Freight Train Riders of America, a gang of rogue freight train riders originally formed by Vietnam veterans
 Freighthopping
 Gutter punk
 Hobo nickel, an art form associated with hoboes
 Hobo (typeface), designed by Morris Fuller Benton for American Type Founders in 1910
 Kirby, Texas, the "hobo capital of Texas"
 Swagman, roughly the equivalent in Australia
 Wobbly lingo, the jargon of the Industrial Workers of the World
 Train surfing

References

Further reading 

 Brady, Jonann (2005). "Hobos Elect New King and Queen". ABC Good Morning America, includes Todd "Ad Man" Waters' last ride as reigning Hobo King plus hobo slide show with Adman's photo's taken on the road.
 Bannister, Matthew (2006). "Maurice W Graham 'Steam Train', Grand Patriarch of America's Hobos who has died aged 89". Last Word. BBC Radio. Matthew Bannister talks to fellow King of the Hobos "Ad Man" Waters and to obituary editor of The New York Times, Bill McDonald.
 Davis, Jason (2007). "The Hobo", On The Road 30 minute special. KSTP television. Covers "Ad Man" Waters taking his daughter out on her first freight ride.
 Harper, Douglas (2006) [1986]. "Waiting for a Train", Excerpt from Good Company: A Tramp Life 
 Johnson, L. Anderson. "Riding the Rails for the Homeless." The New York Times. July 12, 1983, p. B3, col 3. Story on "Ad Man" Waters the Penny Route.
 Oats. "Around the Jungle Fire I, II & III". 1994, 1997, 2000. Interviews with several hoboes: How they got their start, and travels and travails.
 "Hoboes" from the Encyclopedia of Chicago

External links 
 
 

 
Itinerant living
1890s neologisms
American culture